The Exploding Plastic Inevitable, sometimes simply called Plastic Inevitable or EPI, was a series of multimedia events organized by Andy Warhol in 1966 and 1967, featuring musical performances by The Velvet Underground and Nico, screenings of Warhol's films, and dancing and performances by regulars of Warhol's Factory, especially Mary Woronov and Gerard Malanga. Andy Warhol's Exploding Plastic Inevitable is also the title of an 18-minute film by Ronald Nameth with recordings from one week of performances of the shows which were filmed in Chicago, Illinois, in 1966. In December 1966 Warhol included a one-off magazine called The Plastic Exploding Inevitable as part of the Aspen No. 3 package.

Background

The Exploding Plastic Inevitable had its beginnings in an event staged on January 13, 1966, at a dinner for the New York Society for Clinical Psychiatry. This event, called "Up-Tight", included performances by the Velvet Underground and Nico, along with Malanga and Edie Sedgwick as dancers and Barbara Rubin as a performance artist. Inaugural shows were held at the Dom in New York City in April 1966, advertised in The Village Voice as follows: "The Silver Dream Factory Presents The Exploding Plastic Inevitable with Andy Warhol/The Velvet Underground/and Nico." Shows were also held in The Gymnasium in New York and in various cities throughout the United States and Canada.

Legacy
Andy Warhol's lights engineer Danny Williams pioneered many innovations that have since become standard practice in rock music light shows. From May 27–29 the EPI played The Fillmore in San Francisco, where Williams built a light show including stroboscopes, slides and film projections onstage. At Bill Graham's request he was soon to come back and build more. Film maker Jonas Mekas (who pioneered film projections during concerts at New York's Cinematheque), Andy Warhol and Danny Williams' influential ideas contributed much to the legendary Fillmore Auditorium's prestige and were also used at the Fillmore East and Fillmore West, both opening in 1968.

References

The Velvet Underground
Andy Warhol
Performance art in New York City
Performances
1966 works
1967 works